Júlio Antonio de Souza e Almeida (born 23 September 1969) is a Brazilian sport shooter. Almeida had won a total of four medals (two silver and two bronze) in pistol shooting at the Pan American Games (1995 in Mar de Plata, Argentina, 2007 in Rio de Janeiro, and 2011 in Guadalajara, Mexico). He also captured a silver and a bronze medal in centre-fire and standard pistol at the 2010 ISSF World Shooting Championships in Munich, Germany, with scores of 586 and 574, respectively.

At age thirty-nine, Almeida made his official debut for the 2008 Summer Olympics in Beijing, where he competed in three pistol shooting events. He scored a total of 580 targets in the preliminary rounds of the men's 10 m air pistol, by one point behind Armenia's Norayr Bakhtamyan from the final attempt, finishing only in thirteenth place. Three days later, Almeida placed eighteenth in his second event, 50 m rifle pistol, by three points ahead of Italy's Francesco Bruno, with a total score of 554 targets. For his third and final event, 25 m rapid fire pistol, Almeida was able to shoot a total of 568 targets (284 each on the first and second stage) in the preliminary rounds, finishing only in eleventh place by four points behind China's Liu Zhongsheng.

References

External links

Profile – UOL Esporte 
NBC 2008 Olympics profile

Brazilian male sport shooters
Living people
1969 births
Sportspeople from Rio de Janeiro (city)
Olympic shooters of Brazil
Shooters at the 2008 Summer Olympics
Shooters at the 2016 Summer Olympics
Shooters at the 1995 Pan American Games
Shooters at the 2007 Pan American Games
Shooters at the 2011 Pan American Games
Shooters at the 2015 Pan American Games
Pan American Games gold medalists for Brazil
Pan American Games silver medalists for Brazil
Pan American Games bronze medalists for Brazil
Pan American Games medalists in shooting
South American Games gold medalists for Brazil
South American Games bronze medalists for Brazil
South American Games silver medalists for Brazil
South American Games medalists in shooting
ISSF pistol shooters
Competitors at the 2010 South American Games
Competitors at the 2014 South American Games
Shooters at the 2019 Pan American Games
Medalists at the 1995 Pan American Games
Medalists at the 2007 Pan American Games
Medalists at the 2011 Pan American Games
Medalists at the 2015 Pan American Games
Medalists at the 2019 Pan American Games
20th-century Brazilian people
21st-century Brazilian people